Black Caesar can refer to:

 Black Caesar (film), a 1973 blaxploitation film
 Black Caesar (album), the film soundtrack by James Brown
 Black Caesar (pirate) (died 1718), an African pirate 
 John Caesar (1764-179), the first Australian bushranger, nicknamed "Black Caesar"
 Henri Caesar, a Haitian pirate nicknamed "Black Caesar"
 Frank Matthews (drug trafficker) (born 1944), an American drug trafficker nicknamed "Black Caesar"